This article is about the phonology and phonetics of the Slovak language.

Vowels

 Vowel length is phonemic in standard Slovak. Both short and long vowels have the same quality. However, in native words, it is contrastive mostly in the case of the close  and the open back  (but not the open front , which occurs only as short). Among the long mid vowels, the back  appears only in loanwords, whereas the front  appears in loanwords, one native word (dcéra) and adjective endings. Eastern dialects lack the short–long opposition entirely.
 In Western dialects, vowels that are short due to the rhythmical rule are often realized as long, thus violating the rule.
  occur only in loanwords. Just as other mid vowels,  are phonetically true-mid .
 The falling diphthongs ,  as well as  mostly replace ,  and  after soft consonants, though there are exceptions such as jún  'June'.  can also occur after  in some cases.
  is phonetically a diphthong . It is shorter than other diphthongs; in fact, it has the length typical of short monophthongs. It occurs only after . There is not a full agreement about its status in the standard language:
  states that only about 5% of speakers have  as a distinct phoneme, and that even when it is used in formal contexts, it is most often a dialect feature.

Phonetic realization 
 The close  are typically more open  than the corresponding cardinal vowels. The quality of the close front vowels is akin to that of the monophthongal allophone of RP English .
In turn, the mid back  are typically more open than their front counterparts, which means that their quality is close to cardinal .
 The open front vowel  is a phonetic diphthong, transcribed  in this article.
 The open back vowels  are phonetically central .
The close-mid realization of  occurs also in southern dialects spoken near the river Ipeľ.
  are all rising, i.e. their second elements have more prominence.
 The phonetic quality of Slovak diphthongs is as follows:
  and  have the same starting point, the same as the short .
Phonemically, these are interpreted as sequences of  preceded by a vowel.

Transcriptions
Sources differ in the way they transcribe Slovak. The differences are listed below.

Consonants

 Voiceless stops and affricates are unaspirated.
 Voiced stops and affricates are fully voiced.
  is apical alveolar .
  are not always pure palatal plosives, but as the author describes, those are the ideal and standard sounds based on their main characteristics. 
  are laminal .
  are alveolar  or denti-alveolar .
  are alveolar .
 Word-initial  occurs only in two words: dzekať and dziny.
  are alveolo-palatal affricates that are often classified as stops. As in Serbo-Croatian, the corresponding alveolo-palatal fricatives  do not occur in the standard language, thus making the system asymmetrical. The corresponding nasal is alveolo-palatal as well: , but it can also be dento-alveolo-palatal.
  is palatalized laminal denti-alveolar , palatalized laminal alveolar  or palatal . The palatal realization is the least common one.
  describes an additional realization, namely a weakly palatalized apical alveolar approximant . According to this scholar, the palatal realization  is actually alveolo-palatal .
 The  contrast is neutralized before front vowels, where only  occurs.
  are apical alveolar .
  is either neutral  or velarized .
 Short  is most often a tap .
 The retroflexes are less often realized as palato-alveolar .
  occurs mainly in loanwords.
  is realized as:
 Voiced fricative  in onsets before voiced obstruents;
 Voiceless fricative  in onsets before voiceless obstruents;
 An approximant that varies between labiodental  and labio-velar  in coda;
 Approximant  in all other cases.
  is an approximant, either palatal or alveolo-palatal. Between open central vowels, it can be a quite lax approximant .

Some additional notes includes the following (transcriptions in IPA unless otherwise stated):
  can be syllabic: . When they are long (indicated in the spelling with the acute accent: ŕ and ĺ), they are always syllabic, e.g. vlk (wolf), prst (finger), štvrť (quarter), krk (neck), bisyllabic vĺča—vĺ-ča (wolfling), vŕba—vŕ-ba (willow-tree), etc.
  in front of (post)alveolar fricatives has a postalveolar allophone .

Stress

In the standard language, the stress is always on the first syllable of a word (or on the preceding preposition, see below). This is not the case in certain dialects. Eastern dialects have penultimate stress (as in Polish), which at times makes them difficult to understand for speakers of standard Slovak. Some of the north-central dialects have a weak stress on the first syllable, which becomes stronger and moves to the penultimate in certain cases. Monosyllabic conjunctions, monosyllabic short personal pronouns and auxiliary verb forms of the verb byť (to be) are usually unstressed.

Prepositions form a single prosodic unit with the following word, unless the word is long (four syllables or more) or the preposition stands at the beginning of a sentence.

Official transcriptions

Slovak linguists do not usually use IPA for phonetic transcription of their own language or others, but have their own system based on the Slovak alphabet. Many English language textbooks make use of this  alternative transcription system.
In the following table, pronunciation of each grapheme is given in this system as well as in the IPA.

Sample
The sample text is a reading of the first sentence of The North Wind and the Sun. The transcription is based on a recording of a 28-year-old female speaker of standard Slovak from Bratislava.

Phonemic transcription

Phonetic transcription

Orthographic version
Raz sa severák a slnko hádali, kto z nich je silnejší.

See also
Slovak orthography

References

Bibliography

Further reading

 
 
 
 
 
 
 
 
 
 
 
 
 

Phonology
Slavic phonologies